Pigeon Springs is a place in Cowlitz County, Washington. Pigeon Springs is located east of the city of Kalama and along the Kalama River. The springs were a source of bottled mineral water.

The eruption of Mount St. Helens on May 18, 1980, reached the Cowlitz River and Pigeon Springs.

Geography
Pigeon Springs is located at  (46.0531675, -122.6239926).

References

Unincorporated communities in Cowlitz County, Washington
Unincorporated communities in Washington (state)